Zlatarski International School in Sofia, Bulgaria, is an international school.

Founded in 1995, Zlatrski International School of Sofia offers a program of studies for boys and girls aged 14–19. 300 students from grades 8 to 12 attend the school. The 2006/2007 school year marks the graduation of the school's eighth graduating class.

External links

 Official website

Educational institutions established in 1995
International Baccalaureate schools in Bulgaria
British international schools in Bulgaria
1995 establishments in Bulgaria
International schools in Sofia